Pakistan Airways also known as "Pak Air" or "Pak Airways", was an airline from Pakistan with its headquarters in Karachi. The company was founded in 1948 and ceased again in 1949, following a series of air accidents.

Accidents
The airline was involved in four air crashes:
 10 May 1948 at Basra, Iraq. No fatalities.
 26 November 1948: First air crash of a Pakistani airline in the country, near Vehari, Punjab in which 21 people, 5 crew and 16 passengers were died. Aircraft: Douglas C-47A-15-DK Registration: AP-ACE. Cause: believed to be technical error.
 12 December 1949 at Karachi. 26 fatalities. Aircraft: Douglas. Registration: AP-ADI

References

Defunct airlines of Pakistan
Airlines established in 1948
Airlines disestablished in 1949
1949 disestablishments in Pakistan
Pakistani companies established in 1948